2-Methylpentane, trivially known as isohexane, is a branched-chain alkane with the molecular formula C6H14. It is a structural isomer of hexane composed of a methyl group bonded to the second carbon atom in a pentane chain. Using a quantitative structure-activity relationship (QSAR) prediction model, 2-Methylpentane has a research octane number (RON) of 75, motor octane number (MON) of 77, and cetane number (CN) of 29.

See also
 Heteropoly acid

References

Alkanes